Hort is a village in Heves County, Northern Hungary Region, Hungary.

Sights to visit
    The catholic church

References

External links
 Hort
 Földhivatal: Hort
 The church of Hort

Populated places in Heves County